Isla de Jueyes are a group of three small uninhabited islands off the southern coast of Puerto Rico.   Together with Caja de Muertos, Gatas, Morrillito, Ratones, Cardona, and Isla del Frío, Isla de Jueyes is one of seven islands ascribed to the municipality of Ponce. At an area of just 2.89 cuerdas, they are also the smallest of these seven islands. Like Isla del Frío, the islands are considered part of barrio Vayas.

Location

The closest populated point on the mainland is Hacienda Villa Esperanza, also known as Quinta Esperanza, located in barrio Vayas. The islands have an area of just  (2.89 cuerdas) (one cuerda equals 0.97 acres).

Their coordinates are: latitude 17.9592° and longitude -66.5897° (latitude 17°57'33"N and longitude 66°35'23"W).

Geography and climate
The climate is dry and the island supports dry forest. They consists mostly of brush. Though not officially a nature reserve, the island is administered by the Puerto Rico Department of Natural and Environmental Resources. Its length is 0.31 miles (0.5 kilometers) northeast and southwest.

See also

 List of islands of Puerto Rico

References

External links
 Isla de Jueyes at Panoramio

Uninhabited islands of Puerto Rico
Protected areas of Puerto Rico
Islands of Ponce, Puerto Rico